This is a list of privatisations in Iceland.

List of companies

List of assets

See also
List of privatizations

References

Iceland politics-related lists
Lists of companies of Iceland
Iceland
Reform in Iceland